Fujita (written: ,  or ) is a Japanese surname. Notable people with the surname include:

, Japanese handball player
, Japanese long-distance runner
, Japanese shogi player
, Japanese singer
, Japanese musician and model
, Japanese water polo player
Frank Fujita, one of only two Japanese American combat personnel to be captured by the Japanese during World War Two
, Japanese footballer
, Japanese World War II flying ace
, Japanese arranger and composer
, Japanese mixed martial arts fighter
, Japanese ice hockey player
, Japanese glass artist
, Japanese singer, first single "Koi ni Ochite", theme of game "Hiiro no Kakera"
, Japanese actor
, Japanese chemist
, Japanese politician
, Japanese economist
, Warrant Flying Officer of the Imperial Japanese Navy;  conducted the only wartime aircraft bombings on the continental United States
S. Neil Fujita (1921–2010), American graphic designer 
, the second Japanese Bahá'í
, a Japanese voice actress
Scott Fujita (born 1978), an American NFL linebacker
, a Japanese martial artist and Ninja
, a Japanese political theorist
, Japanese hurdler
Ted Fujita (1920–1998), meteorologist, creator of the Fujita scale
, Japanese sport wrestler
, member of the Supreme Court of Japan
 Japanese voice actress
, Japanese footballer
, film director
, Japanese artist, who spent much of his career in France
, Japanese member of parliament
, Governor of Hiroshima Prefecture

See also
Fujita (company), a Japanese Osaka-based zaibatsu
Fujita scale
Fujita salvage operation

Japanese-language surnames